Waxhaw may refer to:

Waxhaw people, a historic tribe native to South Carolina and North Carolina
Waxhaws, a geographical area on the border of South Carolina and North Carolina
Waxhaw, North Carolina, United States
Waxhaw, Mississippi, United States, formerly also known as Waxhaw Plantation

See also
Battle of Waxhaws, 1780